Atanasije and Atanasije the Serb (1200–1265), a disciple of Saint Sava, was a Serbian monk-scribe who lived and worked in Serbia in the Middle Ages. In the 13th century, it was common for monk-scribes not to speak or write about themselves, always cognizant of the fact that their station in life was modest, focussing on the activities of their lords. It is not surprising that very little is known about him. His hymn to Saint Sava, however, has been preserved in Domentijan's biography of Saint Sava in the part describing the return of Saint Sava's relics from Trnovo, Bulgaria, to the Mileševa monastery in Raška. On that occasion, according to Domentijan, the monk-scribe Atanasije wrote and read the "Eulogy to Saint Sava".

See also
 Saint Sava the founder of Serbian medieval literature
 Teodosije the Hilandarian (1246-1328), one of the most important Serbian writers in the Middle Ages
 Elder Grigorije (fl. 1310-1355), builder of Saint Archangels Monastery
 Antonije Bagaš (fl. 1356-1366), bought and restored the Agiou Pavlou monastery
 Lazar the Hilandarian (fl. 1404), the first known Serbian and Russian watchmaker
 Pachomius the Serb (fl. 1440s-1484), hagiographer of the Russian Church
 Miroslav Gospel
 Gabriel the Hilandarian
 Constantine of Kostenets
 Cyprian, Metropolitan of Kiev and All Rus'
 Gregory Tsamblak
 Isaija the Monk
 Grigorije of Gornjak
 Rajčin Sudić
 Jakov of Serres
 Romylos of Vidin
 Jovan the Serb of Kratovo
 Nicodemus of Tismana
 Dimitar of Kratovo
 Anonymous Athonite
 Marko Pećki
 John the Deacon

References

Serbian monks
13th-century Christian monks
People of the Kingdom of Serbia (medieval)
Saint Sava
13th-century Eastern Orthodox Christians
Medieval European scribes
13th-century Serbian writers